Andrzej Wilczyński (died July 1627) was a Roman Catholic prelate who served as  Auxiliary Bishop of Gniezno (1608–1627).

Biography
On 13 Oct 1608, Andrzej Wilczyński was appointed during the papacy of Pope Paul V as Auxiliary Bishop of Gniezno and Titular Bishop of Teodosia. In 1608, he was consecrated bishop by Wojciech Baranowski, Archbishop of Gniezno. While bishop, he was the principal co-consecrator of Jan Kuczborski, Bishop of Chelmno (1614).

References 

17th-century Roman Catholic bishops in the Polish–Lithuanian Commonwealth
Bishops appointed by Pope Paul V
1627 deaths